Stéphane Peu is a French politician, member of the French Communist Party (elected la France Insoumise). He was elected to the French National Assembly on 18 June 2017, representing the department of Seine-Saint-Denis.

See also
 2017 French legislative election

References

1962 births
Living people
People from Pau, Pyrénées-Atlantiques
Politicians from Île-de-France
Deputies of the 15th National Assembly of the French Fifth Republic
French Communist Party politicians
Members of Parliament for Seine-Saint-Denis
Deputies of the 16th National Assembly of the French Fifth Republic